In Ohio, State Route 27 may refer to:
U.S. Route 27 in Ohio, the only Ohio highway numbered 27 since 1927
Ohio State Route 27 (1923-1927), now US 50 (Cincinnati to Milford), SR 28 (Milford to Chillicothe), and SR 180 (Chillicothe to Logan)

27